The Rock Island-Argenta Depot is a historic former railroad station at 4th, Beech, and Hazel Streets in North Little Rock, Arkansas.  It is a single-story brick structure with a roughly cruciform plan.  It has a gabled red tile roof with parapeted gable ends, in the Mediterranean style common to railroad stations of the Rock Island Railroad.  The building houses two waiting rooms, with the telegrapher's bay projecting on the former track side, and a baggage room projecting on the street side.  Built in 1913, it is a well-preserved example of a Rock Island station, and a reminder of the importance of the railroad to the city's growth.

The building was listed on the National Register of Historic Places in 1989.

See also
National Register of Historic Places listings in Pulaski County, Arkansas

References

Railway stations on the National Register of Historic Places in Arkansas
Mission Revival architecture in Arkansas
Buildings and structures in North Little Rock, Arkansas
National Register of Historic Places in Pulaski County, Arkansas
North Little Rock
Railway stations in the United States opened in 1913
Former railway stations in Arkansas